Milham Hanna (born 5 April 1966) is a former Australian rules footballer best known for his playing career with the Carlton Football Club in the 1980s and 1990s.

Nicknamed The Cranium (after his cleanly shaven head, due to alopecia) or simply Mil for short, Hanna is distinguished as having been the first Lebanese-born player in the history of the Victorian Football League/Australian Football League (VFL/AFL). and the only AFL player of Lebanese descent until the debut of Bachar Houli in 2007.

Hanna grew up in the inner-northern suburbs of Melbourne, where he played his junior football in Brunswick East. 

He was known in the VFL/AFL for his athletic physique and fast pace playing as a tall running wingman.

Hanna made his senior playing debut in 1986, but ruptured his anterior cruciate ligament during his first game.  Following almost a year of rehabilitation, he enjoyed a largely injury-free career with Carlton.

Hanna played in two AFL Grand Finals for Carlton: in the 1993 losing side and Carlton's premiership-winning team in 1995. He was selected as a member of the All-Australian team in 1992.

Hanna was inducted into Carlton's Hall of Fame in 2016.

Statistics

|-
|- style="background-color: #EAEAEA"
! scope="row" style="text-align:center" | 1986
|style="text-align:center;"|
| 47 || 1 || 0 || 1 || 1 || 0 || 1 || 1 ||  || 0.0 || 1.0 || 1.0 || 0.0 || 1.0 || 1.0 ||  || 0
|-
! scope="row" style="text-align:center" | 1987
|style="text-align:center;"|
| 13 || 8 || 9 || 6 || 51 || 19 || 70 || 11 || 6 || 1.1 || 0.8 || 6.4 || 2.4 || 8.8 || 1.4 || 0.8 || 0
|- style="background-color: #EAEAEA"
! scope="row" style="text-align:center" | 1988
|style="text-align:center;"|
| 13 || 16 || 3 || 8 || 111 || 38 || 149 || 37 || 6 || 0.2 || 0.5 || 6.9 || 2.4 || 9.3 || 2.3 || 0.4 || 0
|-
! scope="row" style="text-align:center" | 1989
|style="text-align:center;"|
| 13 || 20 || 4 || 7 || 254 || 101 || 355 || 97 || 31 || 0.2 || 0.4 || 12.7 || 5.1 || 17.8 || 4.9 || 1.6 || 9
|- style="background-color: #EAEAEA"
! scope="row" style="text-align:center" | 1990
|style="text-align:center;"|
| 13 || 20 || 4 || 6 || 246 || 121 || 367 || 96 || 28 || 0.2 || 0.3 || 12.3 || 6.1 || 18.4 || 4.8 || 1.4 || 3
|-
! scope="row" style="text-align:center" | 1991
|style="text-align:center;"|
| 13 || 21 || 23 || 21 || 217 || 142 || 359 || 82 || 24 || 1.1 || 1.0 || 10.3 || 6.8 || 17.1 || 3.9 || 1.1 || 6
|- style="background-color: #EAEAEA"
! scope="row" style="text-align:center" | 1992
|style="text-align:center;"|
| 13 || 22 || 4 || 3 || 253 || 102 || 355 || 86 || 32 || 0.2 || 0.1 || 11.5 || 4.6 || 16.1 || 3.9 || 1.5 || 6
|-
! scope="row" style="text-align:center" | 1993
|style="text-align:center;"|
| 13 || 20 || 2 || 10 || 232 || 123 || 355 || 79 || 24 || 0.1 || 0.5 || 11.6 || 6.2 || 17.8 || 4.0 || 1.2 || 4
|- style="background-color: #EAEAEA"
! scope="row" style="text-align:center" | 1994
|style="text-align:center;"|
| 13 || 23 || 15 || 12 || 249 || 165 || 414 || 112 || 23 || 0.7 || 0.5 || 10.8 || 7.2 || 18.0 || 4.9 || 1.0 || 6
|-
|style="text-align:center;background:#afe6ba;"|1995†
|style="text-align:center;"|
| 13 || 21 || 14 || 11 || 261 || 122 || 383 || 117 || 18 || 0.7 || 0.5 || 12.4 || 5.8 || 18.2 || 5.6 || 0.9 || 7
|- style="background-color: #EAEAEA"
! scope="row" style="text-align:center" | 1996
|style="text-align:center;"|
| 13 || 10 || 3 || 2 || 103 || 50 || 153 || 51 || 13 || 0.3 || 0.2 || 10.3 || 5.0 || 15.3 || 5.1 || 1.3 || 0
|-
! scope="row" style="text-align:center" | 1997
|style="text-align:center;"|
| 13 || 8 || 2 || 1 || 56 || 27 || 83 || 29 || 6 || 0.3 || 0.1 || 7.0 || 3.4 || 10.4 || 3.6 || 0.8 || 0
|- class="sortbottom"
! colspan=3| Career
! 190
! 83
! 88
! 2034
! 1010
! 3044
! 798
! 211
! 0.4
! 0.5
! 10.7
! 5.3
! 16.0
! 4.2
! 1.1
! 41
|}

References 

1966 births
VFL/AFL players born outside Australia
Lebanese emigrants to Australia
Sportspeople of Lebanese descent
All-Australians (AFL)
Carlton Football Club players
Carlton Football Club Premiership players
Australian rules footballers from Melbourne
Victorian State of Origin players
Lebanese sportspeople
Living people
Australia international rules football team players
One-time VFL/AFL Premiership players